Union Pacific 1243 is a preserved 4-6-0 "Ten Wheeler" type steam locomotive on display at the Durham Museum in Omaha, Nebraska. Built in 1890, No. 1243 is one of the oldest "Ten Wheelers" owned by the Union Pacific Railroad (UP). It is often named the "Harriman Engine" because, along with sister locomotive No. 1242 currently displayed in Cheyenne, Wyoming, it is the only engine owned by the Union Pacific Railroad from the era when E. H. Harriman controlled the Union Pacific.

History
UP No. 1243 was built in 1890 originally as UP No. 1477. It operated on various branch lines of the Union Pacific in Nebraska. It was renumbered 1243 in 1915. From the 1930s until 1956, the No. 1243 operated on the railroad's Encampment Branch in Wyoming. That same year, the No. 1243 was retired from active service.

Following retirement, No. 1243 resided in Rawlins, Wyoming before going to Cheyenne, Wyoming. In 1990, the 1243 was cosmetically restored and transported on a flat car in a special train to Omaha, Nebraska, where it was placed on display at the Durham Museum in October 1996.

UP 1243 is now a static exhibit at the museum, with no plans to restore it to running condition. It currently sits inside the Trish and Dick Davidson Gallery exhibit, along with a variety of other railroad equipment.

References

1243
4-6-0 locomotives
Cooke locomotives
Railway locomotives introduced in 1890
Individual locomotives of the United States
Standard gauge locomotives of the United States

Preserved steam locomotives of Nebraska